, also called Chita Bus, is a bus company in the Meitetsu Group, based in Handa, Aichi Prefecture, Japan.

Bus Lines

Airport bus 
From Chūbu Centrair International Airport 
For Kariya and Chiryū
For Okazaki 
For Anjō
For Tokoname and Handa
 For Kaminoma (Transit at Tokoname Sta.)
 Cargo Terminal Circular Bus

Regular route bus 
 From Ōtagawa Sta. 
 For Kyōwa Sta. via Uenodai
 For Ōbu sta. via Owari Yokosuka Sta. 
 Tokai City Circular Bus "Ranran Bus"
 From Ōbu Sta. 
 For Ōtagawa Sta. via Owari Yokosuka Sta. 
 For Aichi Health Plaza, NCGG and Genki-no-sato 
 Ōbu City Circular Bus "Fureai Bus"
 From Asakura Sta. 
 For Tsutsujigaoka
 For Sōri
 For Higashi Okada
 Chita City Community Bus ""Aiai Bus"
 From Shinmaiko Sta. For Hinaga Danchi
 From Tatsumigaoka Sta. For Higashigaoka
 From Chita Handa Sta. 
 For Chūbu Centrair International Airport via Tokoname Sta. 
 For Higashiura Sta., Midorigaoka, and Kamezaki Kenja Mae via Okkawa Sta. 
 For Heartful Center Handa
 From Aoyama Sta. 
 For Kimigahashi Jūtaku W.
 For Handa Sta.
 From Tokoname Sta. 
For Chūbu Centrair International Airport
For Chita Handa Sta. 
For Kaminoma Sta. 
For Tokoname City Hospital
 From Kōwa Sta. 
For Morozakikō (Port of Morozaki)
For Utsumi Sta. via Utsumi Senior High Sch. 
Minamichita Town Community Bus "Umikko Bus"

See also 
 Meitetsu Bus

External links
Chita Noriai Homepage 

 

Meitetsu Group
Bus companies of Japan
Transport in Aichi Prefecture